Sterling Chemicals is a chemicals producer, located in Houston, Texas. Product include acetic acid (16% of the North American market) and plasticizers.

In 2011 it was acquired by Eastman Chemical Company.

References

External links
 Official Website

Chemical companies of the United States
Manufacturing companies based in Houston